Weaver or Weavers may refer to:

Activities 
 A person who engages in weaving fabric

Animals 
 Various birds of the family Ploceidae
 Crevice weaver spider family
 Orb-weaver spider family
 Weever (or weever-fish)

Arts and entertainment
 Weaver (Stephen Baxter), the fourth novel in Baxter's Time's Tapestry series
 The Weavers, a folk music group formed in 1947 by Ronnie Gilbert, Lee Hays, Fred Hellerman and Pete Seeger
 The Weavers (1905 film),  a silent, black and white documentary film made in 1905 by the Balkan film pioneers the Manaki brothers
 The Weavers (play), English title of Die Weber, a play by Gerhart Hauptmann
 Weaver, an abandoned ghost town in the 2002 film Disappearance
 Corporal Weaver, a character in the 1998 DreamWorks Animation animated film Antz
 Weaver, the codename for Taylor Hebert in the web serial Worm
 Weaver Marquez, a character in the narrative videogame Kentucky Route Zero
 Grigori Weaver, a character in the 2010 video game Call of Duty: Black Ops and the 2020 sequel Call of Duty: Black Ops Cold War

Places 
 Weaver, Alabama, US
 Weaver, Arizona, US
 Weaver, Indiana, US
 Weaver, Kansas, an unincorporated community
 Weaver, Minnesota, US
 Weavers, Ohio, an unincorporated community
 Weaver, West Virginia, US
 Weavers' Way, a long footpath, or trail, in Norfolk, England
 River Weaver in England
 Weaver Hills in Staffordshire, England
 Weaver Lake (disambiguation)
 Weaver's Mill Covered Bridge in Pennsylvania, US
 Weavers, New South Wales, Australia
 Weaver building, Swansea
 Weaver Siding, New Brunswick
 Weaver Settlement, Nova Scotia

Other uses 
 Weaver (surname)
 Weaver rail mount, a style of mount used to attach a scope to a firearm or crossbow
 Weaver stance, a two-handed stance for use when firing handguns
 Dokumacılar (English: Weavers), a terrorist organisation part of the Islamic State of Iraq and the Levant active in Turkey

See also

Justice Weaver (disambiguation)
The Weavers (disambiguation)

Weever (disambiguation)